Moorook is a town and locality in Australian state of South Australia. It is part of a series of towns surrounding lakes in the Riverland region in Australia. At the 2016 census, Moorook had a population of 189.

The town of Moorook was surveyed in April 1922 on the left bank of the Murray River where it flows north between Loxton and Kingston on Murray. Moorook is just downstream of Moorook Island and upstream of most of Moorook Game Reserve which surrounds and contains Wachtels Lagoon.

Moorook is a few kilometres south of the Sturt Highway and is a few kilometres northeast of the terminus of the former Moorook railway line.

Village settlement

Moorook had earlier been one of the experimental Village Settlements. These were established by the South Australian government under Part VII of the Crown Lands Amendment Act 1893, in an attempt to mitigate the effects of the depression then affecting the Colony.

Hundred of Moorook

The Hundred of Moorook was proclaimed in 1893 to facilitate closer settlement of that part of the County of Albert. The Hundred extends from the Murray River on its northern and northeastern boundary south almost to the Stott Highway and town of Wunkar. it includes the towns of Kingston On Murray and Moorook as well as the localities of Wigley Flat, Yinkanie, Wappilka and most of Woolpunda. The Moorook railway line extended to service the hundred from 1925.

References

Towns in South Australia
Riverland